Dean Peterson (born August 14, 1949) was is a former American football coach.  He was the seventh head football coach  at Frostburg State University in Frostburg, Maryland, serving for six seasons, from 1981 to 1986, and compiling a record of 27–29–3.

References

1949 births
Living people
Frostburg State Bobcats football coaches